Architectonicidae, common name the staircase shells or sundials, are a family of sea snails, marine gastropod mollusks in the informal group "Lower Heterobranchia" (= Allogastropoda) of the clade Heterobranchia.

The extinct families † Amphitomariidae Bandel, 1994 and † Cassianaxidae Bandel, 1996 belong to the same superfamily.

Genera
Genera within the family Architectonicidae include:

 Adelphotectonica Bieler, 1987
 Aguayodiscus Jaume & Borro, 1946
 Architectonica Röding, 1798 – type genus
 Awarua Mestayer, 1930
 Basisulcata Melone & Taviani, 1985
 †Calodisculus Rehder, 1935
 †Climacopoma Fischer, 1885
 †Dinaxis Dall in Aldrich, 1895
 †Discotectonica Marwick, 1931
 †Disculus Deshayes, 1863
 †Eosolarium Chavan, 1947
 †Ewekorolaxis Adegoke, 1977
 Grandeliacus Iredale, 1957 represented as Heliacus (Grandeliacus) Iredale, 1957 (alternate representation)
 †Granoheliacus Melone & Taviani, 1985
 †Granosolarium Sacco, 1892
 Gyriscus Tiberi, 1867
 Heliacus d'Orbigny, 1842
 †Intitectonica Frassinetti & Covacevich, 1984
 †Nigerialaxis Adegoke, 1977
 †Nipteraxis Cossmann, 1916
 †Nodosolarium Sacco, 1892
 Paurodiscus Rehder, 1935
 Philippia J. E. Gray, 1847
 †Platylaxis Adegoke, 1977
 Pseudomalaxis P. Fischer, 1885
 †Pseudotorinia Sacco, 1892
 Psilaxis Woodring, 1928
 †Punjabia Eames, 1952
 Pyrgoheliacus Bieler, 1987
 RedivivusMelone & Taviani, 1985
 †Rinaldoconchus Bandel, 1988
 Solatisonax Iredale, 1931
 Spirolaxis di Monterosato, 1913
 †Stellaxis Dall, 1892
 Teretropoma Rochebrune, 1881 represented as Heliacus (Teretropoma) Rochebrune, 1881 (alternate representation)
 Torinista Iredale, 1936 represented as Heliacus (Torinista) Iredale, 1936 (alternate representation)
 †Trimalaxis Garvie, 1996
 †Wangaloa Finlay, 1927
 Zerotula Finlay, 1927

Genera brought into synonymy
 Acutitectonica Habe, 1961: synonym of Discotectonica Marwick, 1931
 Astronacus Woodring, 1959: synonym of Heliacus (Torinista) Iredale, 1936
 Claraxis Iredale, 1936: synonym of Granosolarium Sacco, 1892
 Discosolis Dall, 1892: synonym of Pseudomalaxis P. Fischer, 1885
 Mangonuia Mestayer, 1930: synonym of Pseudomalaxis P. Fischer, 1885
 †Patulaxis Dall, 1892: synonym of † Climacopoma Fischer, 1885 
 Russetia Garrard, 1961: synonym of Discotectonica Marwick, 1931
 †Solariaxis Dall, 1892 : synonym of Granosolarium Sacco, 1892
 Solarium Lamarck, 1799: synonym of Architectonica Röding, 1798
 Torinia Gray, 1842 : synonym of Heliacus d'Orbigny, 1842

References

 Bieler R. (1993). Architectonicidae of the Indo-Pacific (Mollusca, Gastropoda). Abhandlungen des Naturwissenschaftlichen Vereins in Hamburg (NF) 30: 1–376
 Bouchet P. & Rocroi J.-P. (2005) Classification and nomenclator of gastropod families. Malacologia 47(1–2): 1–397
 Marco Taviani, Revisione delle Architectonicidae del Mediterraneo; Milano, 1984

Further reading 
 Powell A. W. B., New Zealand Mollusca, William Collins Publishers Ltd, Auckland, New Zealand 1979

External links 

 
Taxa named by John Edward Gray